Natasha is an EP by Pig Destroyer, released in 2008 by Relapse Records. The EP consists of a single, unbroken song originally included on special editions of Terrifyer as a DVD. Unlike Pig Destroyer's earlier grindcore material, Natasha showcases the band playing in a sludge/doom style.

The EP also acts as a continuation and ending of the lyrical concept presented on Terrifyer.

Track listing
"Natasha" – 37:55 (Scott Hull, J. R. Hayes)

Personnel
Scott Hull – guitar, production, recording, engineering, mixing, mastering
J.R. Hayes – vocals
Blake Harrison – sampling, ambience, noise
Brian Harvey – drums

References

External links
Interview with vocalist J.R. Hayes: link
"Natasha" at discogs: link

Pig Destroyer albums
2008 EPs
Relapse Records EPs